Spain competed at the 2018 European Championships in Berlin, Germany; and Glasgow, United Kingdom.

Medallists

|  style="text-align:left; width:70%; vertical-align:top;"|

* Participated in the heats only and received medals.
|  style="text-align:left; width:22%; vertical-align:top;"|

Athletics

96 Spanish athletes competed at the games.

Cycling

Road
Men
 Jonathan Castroviejo
 Víctor de la Parte
 Iván García Cortina
 Jesús Herrada
 José Herrada
 Juan José Lobato
 Eduard Prades
 Gonzalo Serrano
 Héctor Sáez

Women
 Alicia González Blanco
 Lucía González Blanco
 Lourdes Oyarbide
 Gloria Rodríguez
 Ane Santesteban
 Alba Teruel

Track
Men
 Alejandro Martínez
 José Moreno
 Juan Peralta
 Joan Martí Bennassar
 Marc Buades
 Julio Alberto Amores
 Sebastián Mora
 Albert Torres
 Illart Zuazubiskar

Women
 Tania Calvo
 Helena Casas
 Ane Iriarte
 Eukene Larrarte
 Ana Usabiaga
 Irene Usabiaga

Mountain biking
Men
 Carlos Coloma
 Sergio Mantecón Gutiérrez
 Pablo Rodríguez
 David Valero

Women
 Claudia Galicia

BMX
Men
 Alejandro Alcojor

Women
 Verónica García

Gymnastics 

Men
Team

Open water swimming

Swimming

Spanish swimmers have achieved qualifying standards in the following events (up to a maximum of 4 swimmers in each event)

Men

Women

Triathlon

References

Weblinks
European Championships

2018 in Spanish sport
2018
Nations at the 2018 European Championships